Blind Veterans UK, formerly St Dunstan's, is a large British charity, providing free support and services to vision-impaired ex-Armed Forces and National Service personnel. Blind Veterans UK is a registered charity in England and Scotland and operates throughout the United Kingdom. It has its head office in London and centres in Brighton, Sheffield and Llandudno.

Description
Established in 1915, Blind Veterans UK provides free services and lifelong support to ex-Service men and women with visual impairments. Its specialist services promote and enable these veterans to regain their independence, meet new challenges and achieve a better quality of life. Blind Veterans UK supports anyone who has served in the British Armed Forces and is experiencing sight loss (be that due to age, accident or illness), and the charity's duty of care extends to all beneficiaries and their families for life. Blind Veterans UK has pioneered many advances in care for the blind and partially sighted; for example, it co-developed the first talking books with the RNIB.

History
Blind Veterans UK was founded by Arthur Pearson and John Fawcett. Arthur had himself lost his sight due to glaucoma. Because of the increasing numbers of blind British soldiers returning from the front lines during the First World War (especially from mustard gas attacks), Pearson and Fawcett established a hostel for these soldiers as well as blinded sailors and airmen. The intention was that, with training and assistance, they could go on to lead productive lives and would not have to depend on charity.

The Blinded Soldiers and Sailors Hostel's first location was in Bayswater Hill, London. Shortly after, the organisation moved to St Dunstan's Lodge in Regent's Park (the site of Winfield House), along with its first 16 members. The committee's work was praised by the London press at the time – a reference to the Lodge appeared in The Illustrated London News in 1915, which said: "in a corner of London's most beautiful park is a house where miracles are worked." American opera singer Pauline Donnan worked with the newly blind soldiers there, teaching vocal techniques and assisting some in finding singing or teaching jobs.

On Pearson's death in 1921, the chairmanship fell to Ian Fraser, who had been placed in charge of the charity's after-care activities by Pearson, providing assistance and social events such as reunion meetings for the blinded veterans after they had left the hostel in Regent's Park. Fraser had served during the First World War in the King's Shropshire Light Infantry and was blinded by a bullet on the Somme. Having become generally known by the name of the building in which it was based, the organisation then formally changed its name to St Dunstan's in 1923. Fraser remained as chairman until his death in 1974.

St Dunstan's opened its flagship training, convalescent, care and holiday centre in Ovingdean, Brighton, in 1938. The Brighton centre was one of the first buildings in Britain purpose-built for those with a disability and every aspect of its construction was specially designed for blind and partially sighted visitors and residents. Shortly  after its opening, The Architect and Building News praised the centre's "magnificent views over the Downs and out to sea", as well as the thought that had gone into making the building ideal for the blind. The centre's residents included World War I veteran Henry Allingham, born 1896, who was briefly the oldest man in the world until his death in 2009.

During the Second World War, the charity admitted those who had lost their sight through their work in the auxiliary services, women's services and munitions factories, besides service personnel from Poland, Netherlands, United States, Canada and South Africa. Due to concerns about potential air raids on Brighton during the Blitz,  the charity evacuated its operation from Brighton to the town of Church Stretton, Shropshire, where it occupied the Long Mynd Hotel and other buildings, setting up an industrial training centre and a hospital. By 1946, the year it returned to Brighton, the charity cared for over 2,000 blind ex-Service personnel. The charity's centre at Brighton was used as an eye hospital during the war.

The charity moved to its current central London headquarters in Harcourt Street, Marylebone, in 1984. In 2000 the charity changed its constitution to allow veterans to join regardless of whether their sight loss was directly related to their service. In 2012, the charity formally became Blind Veterans UK, to help ensure the organisation and its work was "better recognised and understood".

Activities

Blind Veterans UK works to provide vision-impaired Armed Forces and National Service veterans with the services and tailored support they need to lead independent lives after sight loss. The charity's work ranges from helping veterans relearn vital life skills and providing them with the tools they need to be independent in their own homes, to offering new learning, training and recreation opportunities and providing long-term nursing, residential and respite care. It continues to assist veterans blinded in service, including men and women recently deployed in Iraq and Afghanistan.

In 2012, Blind Veterans UK launched its No One Alone campaign to find  people who are unaware that they may be eligible for its assistance. Research from the charity estimated that there could be up to 68,000 ex-Service men and women in the UK who are eligible for its support.

Blind Veterans UK runs a wide variety of activities from its centres in Brighton, Sheffield and Llandudno, including photography, gardening and arts and crafts. Blind Veterans UK has a long-running writing competition, with those supported by the charity submitting their own original stories. The competition has had celebrity judges in the past, including Doctor Who star Jon Pertwee.

The charity also has a sporting reputation, organising blind sports like goalball as well as conventional sports such as shooting, archery and rock-climbing. Two representatives of Blind Veterans UK, Tony Parkinson and Ray Peart, participated in the 1976 Toronto Paralympics. Some Blind Veterans UK representatives have participated in extreme sports, including Billy Baxter, who holds the world record for fastest blind motorcyclist.
Steve Sparkes the first blind person to row the Pacific Ocean. From California, to Hawaii, (in just 82 days) 
Blind Veterans UK runs Project Gemini in partnership with the Blinded Veterans Association, a similar organisation for American veterans. Since forming the partnership in 2011, both organisations have visited each other's centres.

References

Further reading
My Story of St Dunstan's (1961) by Lord Fraser of Lonsdale

External links
Official site

Brighton and Hove
1915 establishments in the United Kingdom
British veterans' organisations
Blindness organisations in the United Kingdom
Charities for disabled people based in the United Kingdom
Charities based in London
Organizations established in 1915